Andrew Neville Wilman (born 16 August 1962) is an English television producer who is best known as the former executive producer of the Top Gear show, from 2002 to 2015, as well as being the executive producer of The Grand Tour. He was responsible for much of the show's style and humour, along with Jeremy Clarkson. He has also presented segments of the original Top Gear. He is primarily responsible for the creation of The Stig. 
Wilman and Clarkson both attended Repton School along with Formula One designer Adrian Newey.

After the original format of Top Gear was cancelled by the BBC, Wilman and ex-presenter Clarkson pitched a new format.

Wilman and Clarkson's company Bedder 6, which handled merchandise and international distribution for Top Gear, earned over £149m in revenue in 2012, prior to a restructuring that gave BBC Worldwide full control of the Top Gear rights.

In April 2015, Wilman announced that he had resigned as executive producer of BBC Television's Top Gear following Jeremy Clarkson's exit in March 2015, owing to Clarkson's "fracas" with a producer. Wilman became the executive producer of The Grand Tour that he, Clarkson, Richard Hammond, and James May produced via their company W. Chump & Sons for release via Amazon Video to Amazon Prime customers. While not appearing on the show, Wilman was often referenced as "Mr Wilman", sending the others texts, which gave them missions, and often insults.

In 2019 after three series, The Grand Tour changed formats, no longer producing episodic series and instead producing only individual episodes similar to specials from previous series. The group closed the W. Chump production company stating it was no longer necessary based on the amount of content being created. Wilman also stated he would be doing a solo project for Amazon, which would be produced following projects from Clarkson, Hammond and May.

On 17 April 2020 Wilman was reported to have contracted COVID-19, and reportedly had difficulty in breathing and was severely affected, leading to delays of the upcoming Grand Tour Specials. The reports did however confirm he was recovering, and on 29 April Wilman appeared in a DriveTribe video confirmed that while he had been "completely out" for ten days, he was now feeling better and recovering well.

Works

As producer
 Jeremy Clarkson's Motorworld (1995–96)
 Jeremy Clarkson's Extreme Machines (1998)
 Jeremy Clarkson: Meets the Neighbours (2002)
 Top Gear (2002–15)
 The Victoria Cross: For Valour (2003)
 Jeremy Clarkson: The Greatest Raid of All Time (2007)
 The Grand Tour produced by W. Chump and Sons: Series 1-3, Expectation Entertainment Series 4- (2016–)
 Clarkson's Farm (2021-)

As presenter
 Top Gear (appeared in 35 episodes, 1994–2001)

Awards


References

External links

 

1962 births
Living people
People from Glossop
People educated at Repton School
English television presenters
Top Gear people